Bhalot / Bhaloot / Bhalote Shera (Punjabi), is a village in Gujrat District, Punjab, Pakistan.

Al Syeda Fatima tul Zahara Model School and College is very famous name in the area, situated in this village.

This village has produced many talented people who have served the county and some are serving currently.

References

Populated places in Gujrat District